Sein Win may refer to:

 Sein Win (general, born 1919) (1919–1993), Burmese brigadier-general, fourth Prime Minister of Burma
 Guardian Sein Win (1922–2013), Burmese journalist
 Ludu Sein Win (1940–2012), Burmese writer and journalist
 Sein Win (politician, born 1944), former Chairman of the National Coalition Government of the Union of Burma, a "government in exile", and unofficial Prime Minister of the Union of Burma
 Sein Win (general, born 1956), Burmese lieutenant-general, Myanmar Minister of Defence, 2015–2021